Public Eye is a sustainability-oriented, politically and religiously independent solidarity development non-governmental organisation based in Switzerland.

Public Eye notably encourages Swiss politics and business to respect human rights and the environment in poor countries.

History and orientation 
Erklärung von Bern, literally Berne Declaration, was founded in 1968 by the merger of signatories to a manifesto on “Switzerland and the Developing Countries“ by a group of theologians, which objected to the growing differences in prosperity between the so-called first world and the third world. One thousand people signed the consequently called Erklärung von Bern, meaning declaration of Bern, and among other things declared to contribute 3% of their income towards development cooperation. On 6 January 1969 the manifesto was presented to the Swiss Federal Council.

In 1971, the movement was constituted into an association. EvB was since the 1970s financially worn from their then about 18,000 members, and is also financed by donations, legacies and the contribututions by volunteers. EvB operates also secretariats in Zürich and Lausanne. As of 2012, EvB was supported nationwide by 23,500 members and is mainly financed by membership dues and donations. At the annual general assembly in 2012, the linguistic regional branches with their individual chairmen were amalgamated into one overall national organization. As of 2016, the NGO is supported by over 25,000 members.

As a representative of the so-called dependency theory, the founder involved especially for the elimination of the dependency of the so-called developing countries by the developed countries and for a sustainable development cooperation. EvB also participated in the 1970s in the drafting of the Federal Law on Development Cooperation, and in 1992 related to the referendum against Switzerland's accession to the International Monetary Fund.

Renaming to Public Eye 

At the general assembly on 23 May 2016, the members decided to change their organisation's name to Public Eye. EvB announced that the NGO's new name is forward-looking, and is already well established thanks to the former counter-summit of the same name that they organised to protest against the Davos World Economic Forum for 15 years. It is believed that Public Eye is more representative of the values, aims and methods of the organisation, and focuses on the issue of "business and human rights". The name change was implemented in mid-September 2016. Henceforth, the organisation publishes, five times a year, its magazine Public Eye Magazin (French: Public Eye – Le magazine).

Goals 
In general, EvD demands in magazines and information campaigns, the creation of fair trade conditions, but also addressed nutrition awareness and health issues, among other things, the use of pesticides, biotechnology and genetic engineering and drug policy.

The focus is to improve the living conditions of the so-called underprivileged populations in other countries, so the EvB declared long-term aims. According to the aims, Switzerland has to formulate its policies in such a way that the Swiss economy does not prosper at the cost of other countries and their populations, by using its membership in international and multilateral organizations Switzerland. Therefore, also campaigns for fair relations between industrialized and so-called developing countries are to organize, as Switzerland is one of the financially richest nations in the world. There are also legally binding regulations to be established, on a national and international level – which compel also business enterprises based in Switzerland to adopt a just, sustainable and social code of conduct, and which render a company's observance of its responsibilities verifiable. According to the EvB's aims, enterprises based in Switzerland assume their corporate social responsibility. Multicorporate enterprises are committed to respecting human rights, labour laws and conventions, as well as socio-ethical, ecological, and peace-keeping norms of conduct, by supporting the entire value creation chain. The Swiss population has to be informed about the conduct of the Swiss business enterprises, and the Swiss policies with respect to developing countries, and therefore to enable the Swiss people to decide and act in a responsible fashion. EvB aims also to increase the awareness of the population with respect to their purchasing decisions, thus creating consumer attitudes which promote equitable economic relations with partner countries.

To achieve these aims, EvB carries out research and gathers information on issues of global justice, with a focus on economic issues and human rights. It also urges politicians and the Swiss government to aim fairer relations with poorer countries and calls on business enterprises to assume their social and ecological responsibilities worldwide and to respect human rights. EvB raises the level of awareness of the population with respect to conscious and sustainable consumption, and networks at home and abroad with other non-governmental organizations and grassroots movements.

Projects

Claro fair trade 

The organisation Suisse Tiers Monde and OS3 are two projects initiated by EvB in 1977, and labelled as Claro fair trade what resulted in a first collaboration with Corr-the jute works situated in Bangladesh. In the following years the product line was expanded gradually, among them cane sugar from the Philippines and other agriculture products from the so-called third world countries, for example coffee from Tanzania, and tea from Sri Lanka, and the cooperative El Ceibo in Bolivia around 1985, and among other sustainable initiatives, it is financially supported by the Alternative Bank Schweiz ABS. The claro products are distributed in claro and associated Weltläden shops in Switzerland.

Alternative Bank Schweiz 

Inspired by the goals of EvB and several organisations, among them various charities, but also Greenpeace and World Wide Fund for Nature (WWF), and also initiated by a commission of the EvB, the Alternative Bank Schweiz (ABS) has since 1990 evolved from the alternative operation with a few people to a hierarchically structured company with departments and supervisors.

Public Eye Award 

From 2000 to 2015, the Public Eye Awards event has been held by EvB and Greenpeace Switzerland in Davos as a counter-event to the annual meeting of the World Economic Forum (WEF), and to spotlight irresponsible business practices. Public Eye was intended as a counter-public view to the closed elitist circle of the WEF. Since 2005 Public Eye has awarded prizes for shameful conduct in order to draw attention to the dark side of the globalization championed by the WEF,
 and NGO's from over 50 countries have already nominated corporations for the Public Eye Awards. Following the announcement of the Lifetime Award winner on 23 January 2015, a closing conference was held in Davos, with the participation of the Yes Men, Sven Giegold, the Association for the Taxation of Financial Transactions and for Citizens' Action Attac co-founder and European Parliamentarian, and Adrian Monck as Managing Director and Head of Public Engagement of the WEF association, as well as Noreena Hertz, economy professor and best-selling author. According to Schweiz aktuell broadcast on 16 January 2015, a last public presence during the 2015 WEF was not guaranteed because of the massively increased security in Davos, which was confirmed by local politicians and by the police official.

Other projects 
 1978: Fachstelle Aktion Finanzplatz Schweiz – Dritte Welt (AFP)
 1991: Max-Havelaar-Stiftung, not directly initiated, but massively supported by EvB's later press releases and so on
 2003: Tax Justice Network

Campaigns (excerpt) 
 1976: "Jute statt Plastik" meaning to use bags made of jute rather than of plastics.
 1997: "Let's go fair - für gerecht produzierte Sportschuhe" related to shoes imported in Switzerland.
 Rohstoff-Kampagne 2014 to comprise a more sustainable handling of natural resources.
 fairfashion2014
 "Entlassung statt Lohnerhöhung bei Bata-Lieferanten" meaning pay increase instead of dismission at the distributor of Bata.
 Collapse of the Rana Plaza fabrication in Savar, Bangladesh. Public Eye takes part in the Clean Clothes Campaign.
 2016: "Dirty Diesel" campaign to force traders – especially Trafigura, but also Vitol, Addax & Oryx, Mercuria and Glencore –  to stop to prepare and sell "African quality" toxic fuel to Africa (with high levels of sulphur causing particulate matter pollution harming people's health). It is the campaign of Public Eye which received the largest international media coverage. The first concrete reaction is that Ghana reduced the maximum limit of sulphur in imported diesel from 3000 to 50 parts per million, from March 2017 (European limit is at 10 parts per million).

Literature 
 Rohstoff - Das gefährlichste Geschäft der Schweiz. Salis, Zürich 2011, .
 Andreas Missbach: Saubere Rendite – Ökologisch und sozial verantwortungsvoll investieren. Ott Verlag, Bern 2007, .
 Anne-Marie Hollenstein, Regula Renschler, Rudolf Strahm: Entwicklung heisst Befreiung. Erinnerungen an die Pionierzeit der Erklärung von Bern (1968–1985). Chronos, Zürich 2008, .
 Renate Spörri: Der Einfluss der Erklärung von Bern auf den Bund. In: Von der Entwicklungshilfe zur Entwicklungspolitik,  published by P. Hug and B. Mesmer, Bern 1993.

References

External links 
 
 

1968 establishments in Switzerland
Organizations established in 1968
Sustainability organizations
Sustainability in Switzerland
Economics of sustainability
Economy of Switzerland
Society of Switzerland
Anti-globalization organizations
Organisations based in Zürich
Human rights organisations based in Switzerland
Political organisations based in Switzerland
Think tanks based in Switzerland
Swiss Climate Alliance